William Radcliffe Birt FRAS (1804–1881) was an English amateur astronomer in the 19th century. Birt worked extensively with John Herschel, carrying out a great deal of meteorogical research on atmospheric waves, from 1843 to 1850. A lot of his work is held in the Scientist's Collection at the American Philosophical Society.

Probably on Herschel's recommendation, Birt became involved with the Kew Observatory in the later 1840s under the Directorship of Francis Ronalds.  He analysed and published the latter's detailed atmospheric electricity and meteorological observations.  They also worked together on a new design of kite for making meteorological recordings in the upper air.  Birt was formally appointed in late 1849 as Ronalds’ assistant but their relationship soured shortly afterwards and Birt was requested by the Kew Committee to leave in mid-1850.

The lunar crater Birt is named after him.

References

Further reading
 
 Obituary in MNRAS, (1882), v. 42, p. 142-144.

External links
 Vladimir Jankovic, 'John Herschel's and William Radcliffe Birt's research on atmospheric waves'
 Scientists Collection
 
 

1804 births
1881 deaths
Amateur astronomers
English meteorologists
19th-century British astronomers
Fellows of the Royal Astronomical Society